Mugdha Vilas Joshi (born 10 November 1993) is a Maharashtrian cricketer who plays as a right-handed batter. She currently plays for, and captains, Pondicherry. She has previously played for Mumbai, and West Zone in the Inter Zone Three Day Competition.

References

External links

1993 births
Living people
West Zone women cricketers
Mumbai women cricketers
Pondicherry women cricketers